Anastasiya Prokopenko, nee Samusevich (Łacinka: Nastassia Samusievič Prakapienka; born 20 September 1985) is a Belarusian modern pentathlete who competed at  three Summer Olympics.

Career
In 2018, she was awarded the bronze medal of the women's competition at the 2008 Olympics in Beijing, following the disqualification of Ukraine's Viktoriya Tereshchuk, due to a doping offense. She finished sixth in 2012. Prokopenko also set a world record time of 10:20.90 in the combined running and shooting segment.

Prokopenko also won a team gold medal at the 2007 World Modern Pentathlon Championships in Berlin, Germany, along with her compatriots Tatsiana Mazurkevich and Hanna Vasilionak.

At the 2018 World Modern Pentathlon Championships in Mexico City, Prokopenko won the world title in the women's individual event  as well as in the Women's Relay event (together with compatriot Iryna Prasiantsova)

References

External links

1985 births
Living people
Belarusian female modern pentathletes
Olympic modern pentathletes of Belarus
Modern pentathletes at the 2008 Summer Olympics
Modern pentathletes at the 2012 Summer Olympics
Modern pentathletes at the 2016 Summer Olympics
Modern pentathletes at the 2020 Summer Olympics
World Modern Pentathlon Championships medalists
People from Slutsk
Olympic bronze medalists for Belarus
Olympic medalists in modern pentathlon
Medalists at the 2008 Summer Olympics
Sportspeople from Minsk Region
20th-century Belarusian women
21st-century Belarusian women